Veseud may refer to several villages in Romania:

 Veseud, a village in Chirpăr Commune, Sibiu County
 Veseud, a village in Slimnic Commune, Sibiu County